Tabati (also Romanized as Tabatī and Tabbatī; also known as Tabalsi) is a village in Miyan Ab-e Shomali Rural District, in the Central District of Shushtar County, Khuzestan Province, Iran. At the 2006 census, its population was 250, in 53 families.

References 

Populated places in Shushtar County